Shaun Grigg (born 19 April 1988) is a former professional Australian rules footballer who played 171 games for  and 43 games for  over a 13 year AFL career. He was a premiership player with Richmond in 2017, an Under 18 All Australian and twice placed in the top five in Richmond club best and fairests.

Early life and junior football
Grigg grew up in the Victorian country town of Linton, 33 kilometres south-west of Ballarat. He attended high school at St Patrick's College. He was part of the school's First XVIII football side which won the coveted Herald Sun Shield in 2005. He played with Redan in his younger years before joining the North Ballarat Rebels in the TAC Cup. In 2006 he represented the Victorian Country side at the national Under 18 championships where he won All-Australian selection. At the 2006 AFL Draft Combine he recorded a top 10 time in the 20 metre sprint.

AFL career

Carlton (2007-2010)

He suffered a shoulder injury early in the 2007 season and struggled as a result. He played matches early in the season with Carlton's , the Northern Bullants. Grigg made his AFL debut against  in Round 14, 2007 and played a total of 5 games for the season.
 
Grigg earned a regular position in the Carlton team throughout 2008, playing 20 senior games and receiving a nomination for the NAB Rising Star award in Round 19. He kicked his first career goal in Round 4, 2008 in a match against .

Over the next two seasons however, Grigg struggled to play regularly in the senior side, playing only a combined total of 18 games for the club.

In October 2010 Grigg asked to be traded from the Carlton Football Club with  his desired trade destination. He cited a desire for greater on-field opportunities as his key reason for seeking the move. A deal was finalised eight days later, with Grigg involved in a straight swap for Tigers' midfielder Andrew Collins. He had played 43 games for the club over his four year tenure.

Richmond (2011-2019)
Grigg made his debut for Richmond in Round 1 of the 2011 season in a match against his former club  at the MCG.
He finished his first season at Richmond having played 21 games and recording an average  of 22 disposals per game. It was a then-career best year in all major statistical categories including total disposals, marks, tackles and goals.

In 2012 Grigg was one of the most improved players in the league. He played all 22 matches that season and recorded a career best 561 disposals, good for fourth best at the club. He finished in fifth place in the club'sbest & fairest award, receiving the Kevin Bartlett Medal for his efforts. Grigg also polled a career best 11 votes in the Brownlow Medal, placing third at the club that season.

He would again play all possible matches in 2013, including a role in his first final at Richmond; a loss against former club Carlton. He polled 5 votes in the Brownlow medal count that year, placing equal fifth of all Richmond players that season.

2014 saw Grigg's first injury affected season at Richmond.
Grigg played as a tagger for much of the season. He finished the season having played 15 games, his lowest total in his time at Richmond.

In 2015 Grigg would return to form, playing in all possible matches for the third time in four seasons. As a contested-ball player, he led the club for tackles that year, with a career-best total of 98 across 23 matches. His performance in Round 15 was particularly praiseworthy, with Grigg picking up the second-most coaches votes of any Tiger for his 25 disposal and seven clearance effort. He played his 100th match for Richmond that year, in a Round 20 match against .

Grigg played parts of the 2016 season in a new role as an inside midfielder. In the 2016 pre-season Grigg suffered a fractured left thumb. He defied initial expectations to return to fitness for the club's Round 2 match against Collingwood, missing just one match in the process. He went on to play in a total of 20 matches that season. Grigg earned his second Kevin Bartlett Medal in 2016, after placing fourth at the club for disposals, tackles and clearances as well as second in inside 50 entries.

In 2017, Richmond coach Damien Hardwick labelled Grigg the smartest footballer at Richmond, noting his ability to 'read the game' a fraction faster than others. By that season he was the oldest player in Richmond's regular AFL team and the second oldest contracted player at the club behind only Ivan Maric.

Grigg suffered a hamstring strain in the lead-up to round 7, 2018 and missed that match as a result. He was considered a "touch and go" chance to play the following week but ultimately missed his second straight match. He made his return in round 9, called up as a late-replacement for first-year forward Jack Higgins.

On 14 May 2019, Grigg announced his immediate retirement from AFL football, having failed to play a match at any level that season due to persistent knee and hip injures. His decision to retire mid-season allowed Richmond a list spot to use at the 2019 mid-season rookie draft, which was used to recruit eventual 2019 premiership player Marlion Pickett.

He concluded his career having played 214 AFL matches.

Coaching career
In October 2019, Grigg joined the Geelong Football Club coaching panel as a development coach.

Statistics

|-
|- style="background-color: #EAEAEA"
! scope="row" style="text-align:center" | 2007
|style="text-align:center;"|
| 16 || 5 || 0 || 1 || 28 || 31 || 59 || 17 || 3 || 0.0 || 0.2 || 5.6 || 6.2 || 11.8 || 3.4 || 0.6
|-
! scope="row" style="text-align:center" | 2008
|style="text-align:center;"|
| 16 || 20 || 4 || 5 || 164 || 150 || 314 || 81 || 42 || 0.2 || 0.3 || 8.2 || 7.5 || 15.7 || 4.1 || 2.1
|- style="background-color: #EAEAEA"
! scope="row" style="text-align:center" | 2009
|style="text-align:center;"|
| 16 || 10 || 3 || 5 || 94 || 102 || 196 || 32 || 29 || 0.3 || 0.5 || 9.4 || 10.2 || 19.6 || 3.2 || 2.9
|-
! scope="row" style="text-align:center" | 2010
|style="text-align:center;"|
| 16 || 8 || 3 || 2 || 82 || 90 || 172 || 42 || 25 || 0.4 || 0.3 || 10.3 || 11.3 || 21.5 || 5.3 || 3.1
|- style="background-color: #EAEAEA"
! scope="row" style="text-align:center" | 2011
|style="text-align:center;"|
| 6 || 21 || 6 || 10 || 271 || 190 || 461 || 107 || 57 || 0.3 || 0.5 || 12.9 || 9.0 || 22.0 || 5.1 || 2.7
|-
! scope="row" style="text-align:center" | 2012
|style="text-align:center;"|
| 6 || 22 || 18 || 10 || 322 || 239 || 561 || 133 || 44 || 0.8 || 0.5 || 14.6 || 10.9 || 25.5 || 6.0 || 2.0
|- style="background-color: #EAEAEA"
! scope="row" style="text-align:center" | 2013
|style="text-align:center;"|
| 6 || 23 || 15 || 10 || 281 || 204 || 485 || 139 || 74 || 0.7 || 0.4 || 12.2 || 8.9 || 21.1 || 6.0 || 3.2
|-
! scope="row" style="text-align:center" | 2014
|style="text-align:center;"|
| 6 || 15 || 3 || 6 || 151 || 156 || 307 || 64 || 36 || 0.2 || 0.4 || 10.1 || 10.4 || 20.5 || 4.3 || 2.4
|- style="background-color: #EAEAEA"
! scope="row" style="text-align:center" | 2015
|style="text-align:center;"|
| 6 || 23 || 16 || 10 || 259 || 229 || 488 || 105 || 98 || 0.7 || 0.4 || 11.3 || 10.0 || 21.2 || 4.6 || 4.3
|-
! scope="row" style="text-align:center" | 2016
|style="text-align:center;"|
| 6 || 20 || 10 || 7 || 257 || 229 || 486 || 106 || 72 || 0.5 || 0.4 || 12.9 || 11.5 || 24.3 || 5.3 || 3.6
|- style="background-color: #EAEAEA"
! scope="row" style="text-align:center" | 2017
|style="text-align:center;"|
| 6 || 25 || 15 || 13 || 322 || 255 || 577 || 131 || 94 || 0.6 || 0.5 || 12.9 || 10.2 || 23.1 || 5.2 || 3.8
|-
! scope="row" style="text-align:center" | 2018
|style="text-align:center;"|
| 6 || 22 || 3 || 5 || 238 || 217 || 455 || 97 || 64 || 0.1 || 0.2 || 10.8 || 9.9 || 20.7 || 4.4 || 2.9
|- style="background-color: #EAEAEA"
! scope="row" style="text-align:center" | 2019
|
| 6 || 0 || — || — || — || — || — || — || — || — || — || — || — || — || — || —
|- class="sortbottom"
! colspan=3| Career
! 214
! 96
! 84
! 2469
! 2092
! 4561
! 1054
! 638
! 0.4
! 0.4
! 11.5
! 9.8
! 21.3
! 4.9
! 3.0
|}

Representative career
In 2011 Grigg was a member of the Australian squad for a two match International rules series against Ireland and played two matches.

Honours and achievements
Team
 AFL premiership player: 2017
 McClelland Trophy: 2018

Individual
2× Kevin Bartlett Medal (5th RFC B&F): 2012, 2016
AFL Rising Star nominee: 2008

Junior
U-18 All-Australian: 2006

Personal life
Grigg is married to wife Sarah. The couple had their first child, Sonny, in June 2014. They had a second son, Spencer Leigh, in December 2017. 

He is a part-owner in multiple SpudBar franchise restaurants.

References

External links

Shaun Grigg's statistics from Footy Wire
   

1988 births
Living people
Carlton Football Club players
Preston Football Club (VFA) players
Richmond Football Club players
Richmond Football Club Premiership players
Australian rules footballers from Victoria (Australia)
Greater Western Victoria Rebels players
Redan Football Club players
People educated at St Patrick's College, Ballarat
Australia international rules football team players
One-time VFL/AFL Premiership players